Diloma durvillaea is a species of sea snail, a marine gastropod mollusk in the family Trochidae, the top snails.

Description
The height of the shell attains 11 mm, its diameter 10 mm.

Distribution
This marine  species is endemic to New Zealand and occurs off South Island.

References

External links
 To Barcode of Life (8 barcodes)
 To Encyclopedia of Life
 To GenBank (16 nucleotides; 8 proteins)
 To World Register of Marine Species

durvillaea
Gastropods of New Zealand
Gastropods described in 2009